Guzmania osyana is a species of plant in the family Bromeliaceae. It is endemic to Ecuador.  Its natural habitats are subtropical or tropical moist lowland forests and subtropical or tropical moist montane forests. It was last known to be threatened by habitat loss in 2003.

References

Endemic flora of Ecuador
osyana
Endangered plants
Taxonomy articles created by Polbot